Elvis Abbruscato (born 14 April 1981) is an Italian former professional footballer who played as a forward; he was a youth coach at Arezzo as of 2016–17 season.

Club career
Abbruscato played for Arezzo, Torino, Chievo (loan), Vicenza Virtus, Pescara, Cremonese, and FeralpiSalò in his career.

Verona
After making his professional debut with his hometown club Reggiana, he joined Verona in 1999. He went on loan to Livorno and Triestina from 2000 to 2002. In July 2002 he was included in the pre-season camp of the first team of Verona, making his club debut during 2002–03 Serie B season.

Arezzo
In summer 2003 he was signed by Serie C1 club Arezzo on a co-ownership deal. On 22 June 2004 Arezzo signed Abbruscato outright from Verona.

Torino
In January 2006 Abbruscato was signed by Torino on a temporary basis, for €800,000 fee. In June 2006 he was signed outright for €3.6 million, on a four-year contract. However, in summer 2007 he was sold to Lecce on a co-ownership deal for €1.65 million. In June 2008, Torino bought back the 50% registration rights of Abbruscato from Lecce for €2 million.

In summer 2009, he left Turin again for Chievo on a temporary basis for free.

Vicenza
In summer 2010, Abbruscato was signed by Vicenza on a three-year contract for €1.2 million fee, as part of a swap that Alessandro Sgrigna went to Turin for €1.32 million.

Late career
In June 2012, Abbruscato was sold to Pescara from Vicenza for a cashless swap with Stefano Giacomelli. Both players were tagged for €2.3 million. Abbruscato signed a two-year contract.

However, Abbruscato was released at the end of season. He joined Cremonese on a free transfer.

In July 2014 he moved from Cremonese to join FeralpiSalò.

Managerial career
Abbruscato became the head coach of Seconda Categoria team ViaEmilia in the second half of 2015–16 season. He was signed by Arezzo for their under-19 team on 19 July 2016.

In June 2017 he was enrolled in a course for UEFA A Licence.

References

External links
 La Gazzetta dello Sport profile (2007–08 season)
 
 

Italian footballers
Italy youth international footballers
Italian football managers
A.C. Reggiana 1919 players
Hellas Verona F.C. players
U.S. Livorno 1915 players
U.S. Triestina Calcio 1918 players
S.S. Arezzo players
Torino F.C. players
U.S. Lecce players
A.C. ChievoVerona players
L.R. Vicenza players
Delfino Pescara 1936 players
U.S. Cremonese players
FeralpiSalò players
U.S. Fiorenzuola 1922 S.S. players
Serie A players
Serie B players
Serie C players
Serie D players
Association football forwards
Sportspeople from Reggio Emilia
1981 births
Living people
Footballers from Emilia-Romagna